is a former Japanese professional baseball player.

Career
He was born in Chōshi, Chiba, Japan, and graduated from Choshi Commercial High School in 1965. He started his professional career with the Lotte Orions in 1966. As a pitcher, he won 112 games in his professional career. He retired in 1976. He received the Most Valuable Player in the Pacific League award in 1970. He topped the league in wins in 1969 and in ERA in 1971.

References

Living people
1943 births
People from Chōshi
Baseball people from Chiba Prefecture
Japanese baseball players
Tokyo Orions players
Lotte Orions players
Nippon Professional Baseball MVP Award winners
Japanese baseball coaches
Nippon Professional Baseball coaches